Pectinimura areola is a moth in the family Lecithoceridae. It is found in Papua New Guinea.

The length of the forewings is 5.5–6 mm. The forewings are pale orange, with irregularly scattered brownish scales. The postmedian fascia is yellowish brown, well-developed from the costa to the inner margin, broadened near both ends, concave on the outer margin. The terminal fascia are brownish yellow and the costa is nearly straight beyond the basal one-fourth, with a dark brown fascia along the margin for one-fourth length.

Etymology
The species name is derived from Latin areola (meaning a small open space).

References

Moths described in 2011
areola